"If You Go Away" is an adaptation of the 1959 Jacques Brel song "Ne me quitte pas" with English lyrics by Rod McKuen.  Created as part of a larger project to translate Brel's work, "If You Go Away" is considered a pop standard and has been recorded by many artists, including Greta Keller, for whom some say McKuen wrote the lyrics.

The complex melody is partly derivative of classical music: the "But if you stay..." passage comes from Franz Liszt's Hungarian Rhapsody No. 6.

Lyrics
A sad but hopeful ballad, the lyrics are told from the perspective of someone telling their lover how much they'd be missed if they left.  This is described in vivid, hyperbolic terms, such as "there'll be nothing left in the world to trust".  If the lover stays, the narrator promises them both devotion and good times ("I'll make you a day / Like no day has been, or will be again").  Some lines show that the narrator is speaking to the lover as they are already leaving, or considering doing so ("Can I tell you now, as you turn to go...").  The lines "If you go, as I know you will" and later "...as I know you must" make clear that despite the narrator's protests, the lover's leaving is inevitable.

McKuen's translation is significantly different from the original Brel lyric. The English version is based around contrasting what would happen "if you go away" and what could happen "if you stay".

In the original French version, the singer begs for his lover not to leave him and is more supplicant and almost self-humiliating (the title "Ne me quitte pas" translates "Do not leave me"). Significant is the last image of the French version; although the McKuen version has lyrics that come close to the original sentiment, the French lyrics are far bleaker (as is the song in general): "Let me become the shadow of your shadow, the shadow of your hand, the shadow of your dog" (lit. translation of the original) as opposed to "I'd have been the shadow of your shadow if I thought it might have kept me by your side" (English lyrics).

The English version omits a section of the original version in which the singer begs his lover to give their relationship a second chance, using examples derived from the natural world: "I will tell you of those lovers who saw their hearts catch fire twice;" "Fire has often been seen gushing out of an ancient volcano we thought too old"; "There are, people say, burnt lands that produce more wheat than the best of Aprils".

Recordings
Damita Jo reached no. 10 on the Adult Contemporary chart and no. 68 on the Billboard Hot 100 in 1966 for her version of the song.  Terry Jacks recorded a version of the song which was released as a single in 1974 and reached no. 29 on the Adult Contemporary chart, no. 68 on the Billboard Hot 100, and went to no. 8 in the UK.

Many other artists have recorded the song. Among the most notable is Shirley Bassey's version released as a single which also appeared on her album And We Were Lovers. McKuen was very fond of Bassey's version and wrote to her saying he enjoyed it and thanking her. In 2002, her version of the song featured in the movie Merci Docteur Rey.

Related songs

Nick Currie, better known as Momus, returned to Brel's original song and translated it as "Don't Leave" in 1986, released initially on the Jacques EP and then on an expanded reissue of the album Circus Maximus. This was lyrically closer to the original, notably using the formulation "Me, I'll ..." (common as "moi, je ..." in French but rarely used in English).

References

External links
 Brelitude Jacques Brel's covers website

Songs about heartache
Songs about parting
Songs written by Jacques Brel
Jacques Brel songs
Dusty Springfield songs
Shirley Bassey songs
Brenda Lee songs
Tom Jones (singer) songs
Frank Sinatra songs
Oliver (singer) songs
Neil Diamond songs
Ray Charles songs
Cyndi Lauper songs
Madonna songs
Glen Campbell songs
Barbra Streisand songs
Eartha Kitt songs
Scott Walker (singer) songs
Number-one singles in Norway
Pop standards
Pop ballads
Songs written by Rod McKuen